Charlotte Finkelstein Brooks (September 16, 1918 – March 15, 2014) was an American photographer and photojournalist. From 1951 to 1971, she was a staff photographer for Look and the only woman staff photographer in the magazine's history.

Biography
Brooks née Finkelstein was born on September 16, 1918, in Brooklyn.

She studied psychology at Brooklyn College and at the University of Minnesota.  After a short period in Bernice Abbott's photography class at the New School for Social Research, she studied dance at the school with Barbara Mettler. In 1942, Brooks began to assist Barbara Morgan in her studio in Scarsdale, New York, quickly adopting photography as her vocation.

Inspired by Dorothea Lange, she began to produce informative social reform photographs. In 1943, she worked as an assistant to Gjon Mili, doing advertising photography for Life and Vogue. In 1945, she worked freelance with Standard Oil of New Jersey, illustrating the story of oil in home life and in fighting the war.

In 1951, she began her career at Look, first working on advertising assignments. Brooks gradually took on news stories, beginning with the candidacy of Dwight D. Eisenhower for president in 1952.  Other assignments included medical stories, education, and the coverage of various American cities. She also photographed many celebrities, including Marilyn Monroe and Lucille Ball. Ed Sullivan introduced her from his audience as "the best girl photographer." Brooks continued to work at Look until the magazine ceased publication in 1971.

Brooks died on March 15, 2014, in Holmes, New York.

The Charlotte Brooks archive is located at the Library of Congress.

References

Further reading

<

External links

Examples of Charotte Brooks' work from The Library of Congress

1918 births
2014 deaths
American photojournalists
American women photographers
People from Brooklyn
The New School alumni
University of Minnesota College of Liberal Arts alumni
Brooklyn College alumni
Journalists from New York City
21st-century American women
Women photojournalists